Robin White was the defending champion of the singles event at the Amway Classic tennis tournament, but lost in the first round.

Unseeded Elna Reinach won her first WTA title, defeating Caroline Kuhlman, who entered the competition with a wildcard, in the final, 6–0, 6–0.

Seeds

Draw

Finals

Top half

Bottom half

References

External links
 ITF tournament edition details

ASB Classic - Women's Singles
WTA Auckland Open